Bounded rationality is the idea that rationality is limited when individuals make decisions, and under these limitations, rational individuals will select a decision that is satisfactory rather than optimal.

Limitations include the difficulty of the problem requiring a decision, the cognitive capability of the mind, and the time available to make the decision. Decision-makers, in this view, act as satisficers, seeking a satisfactory solution, with everything that they have at the moment rather than an optimal solution. Therefore, humans do not undertake a full cost-benefit analysis to determine the optimal decision, but rather, choose an option that fulfils their adequacy criteria. An example of this being within organisations when they must adhere to the operating conditions of their company, this has the opportunity to result in bounded rationality as the organisation is not able to choose the optimal option.

Some models of human behavior in the social sciences assume that humans can be reasonably approximated or described as "rational" entities, as in rational choice theory or Downs' political agency model. The concept of bounded rationality complements "rationality as optimization", which views decision-making as a fully rational process of finding an optimal choice given the information available. Therefore, bounded rationality can be said to address the discrepancy between the assumed perfect rationality of human behaviour (which is utilised by other economics theories such as the Neoclassical approach), and the reality of human cognition.  In short, bounded rationality revises notions of "perfect" rationality to account for the fact that perfectly rational decisions are often not feasible in practice because of the intractability of natural decision problems and the finite computational resources available for making them. The concept of bounded rationality continues to influence (and be debated in) different disciplines, including political science, economics, psychology, law and cognitive science.

Background and motivation
 was coined by Herbert A. Simon, where it was proposed as an alternative basis for the mathematical and neoclassical economic modelling of decision-making, as used in economics, political science, and related disciplines. Many economics models assume that agents are on average rational, and can in large quantities be approximated to act according to their preferences in order to maximise utility. With bounded rationality, Simon's goal was "to replace the global rationality of economic man with a kind of rational behavior that is compatible with the access to information and the computational capacities that are actually possessed by organisms, including man, in the kinds of environments in which such organisms exist." Prior to coining the term bounded rationality, studies in this area were starting to take place. A study completed by Allais in 1953 began to generate ideas of the irrationality of decision making as he found that given preferences, individuals will not always choose the most rational decision and therefore the concept of rationality was not always reliable in economic predictions.

In Models of Man, Simon argues that most people are only partly rational, and are irrational in the remaining part of their actions. In another work, he states "boundedly rational agents experience limits in formulating and solving complex problems and in processing (receiving, storing, retrieving, transmitting) information". Simon used the analogy of a pair of scissors, where one blade represents "cognitive limitations" of actual humans and the other the "structures of the environment", illustrating how minds compensate for limited resources by exploiting known structural regularity in the environment.

Simon describes a number of dimensions along which "classical" models of rationality can be made somewhat more realistic, while remaining within the vein of fairly rigorous formalization. These include:

 limiting the types of utility functions
 recognizing the costs of gathering and processing information
 the possibility of having a "vector" or "multi-valued" utility function

Simon suggests that economic agents use heuristics to make decisions rather than a strict rigid rule of optimization. They do this because of the complexity of the situation. An example of behaviour inhibited by heuristics can be seen when comparing the cognitive strategies utilised in simple situations (e.g Tic-tac-toe), in comparison to strategies utilised in difficult situations (e.g Chess). Both games, as defined by game theory economics, are finite games with perfect information, and therefore equivalent. However, within Chess, mental capacities and abilities are a binding constraint, therefore optimal choices are not a possibility. Thus, in order to test the mental limits of agents, complex problems, such as those within Chess, should be studied to test how individuals work around their cognitive limits, and what behaviours or heuristics are used to form solutions

Anchoring and adjustment are types of heuristics that give some explanation to bounded rationality and why decision makers do not make rational decisions. A study undertaken by Zenko et al. showed that the amount of physical activity completed by decision makers was able to be influenced by anchoring and adjustment as most decision makers would typically be considered irrational and would unlikely do the amount of physical activity instructed and it was shown that these decision makers use anchoring and adjustment to decide how much exercise they will complete

Example of Bounded Rationality 

A good example of Bounded Rationality in individuals would be a customer who made a suboptimal decision to order some food at the restaurant because they felt rushed by the waiter who was waiting beside the table. Another example is a trader who would make a moderate and risky decision to trade their stock due to time pressure and imperfect information of the market at that time.

In organisational context, a CEO cannot make fully rational decisions in an ad-hoc situation because their cognition was overwhelmed by a lot of information in that tense situation. The CEO also needs to take time to process all the information given to them, but due to the limited time and fast decision making needed, they will disregard some information in determining the decision.

Model extensions

As decision-makers have to make decisions about how and when to decide, Ariel Rubinstein proposed to model bounded rationality by explicitly specifying decision-making procedures as decision-makers with the same information are also not able to analyse the situation equally thus reach the same “rational” decision. Rubinstein argues that consistency in reaching final decision for the same level of information must factor in the decision making procedure itself. This puts the study of decision procedures on the research agenda.

Gerd Gigerenzer opines that decision theorists, to some extent, have not adhered to Simon's original ideas. Rather, they have considered how decisions may be crippled by limitations to rationality, or have modeled how people might cope with their inability to optimize. Gigerenzer proposes and shows that simple heuristics often lead to better decisions than theoretically optimal procedures. Moreover, Gigerenzer states, agents react relative to their environment and use their cognitive processes to adapt accordingly.

Huw Dixon later argues that it may not be necessary to analyze in detail the process of reasoning underlying bounded rationality. If we believe that agents will choose an action that gets them "close" to the optimum, then we can use the notion of epsilon-optimization, which means we choose our actions so that the payoff is within epsilon of the optimum.

The notion of strict rationality is then a special case (ε=0). The advantage of this approach is that it avoids having to specify in detail the process of reasoning, but rather simply assumes that whatever the process is, it is good enough to get near to the optimum.

From a computational point of view, decision procedures can be encoded in algorithms and heuristics. Edward Tsang argues that the effective rationality of an agent is determined by its computational intelligence. Everything else being equal, an agent that has better algorithms and heuristics could make "more rational" (closer to optimal) decisions than one that has poorer heuristics and algorithms.

Tshilidzi Marwala and Evan Hurwitz in their study on bounded rationality observed that advances in technology (e.g. computer processing power because of Moore's law, artificial intelligence, and big data analytics) expand the bounds that define the feasible rationality space. Because of this expansion of the bounds of rationality, machine automated decision making makes markets more efficient.

The model of bounded rationality also extends to bounded self-interest, in which humans are sometimes willing to forsake their own self-interests for the benefits of others due to incomplete information that the individuals have at the time being. This is something that has not been considered in earlier economic models.

The theory of rational inattention, an extension of bounded rationality, studied by Christopher Sims, found that decisions may be chosen with incomplete information as opposed to affording the cost to receive complete information. This shows that decision makers choose to endure bounded rationality.

On the other hand, another extension that came from the notion of bounded rationality was explained by Ulrich Hoffrage and Torsten Reimer in their studies in which the fast and frugal heuristic approach. The studies explained that complete information sometimes is not needed as there are easier and simpler way to reach the same “optimal” outcome. However, this approach which is usually known as Gaze Heuristic was explained to be the theory for non-complex decision making only.

Behavioral economics

Bounded rationality implies the idea that humans take reasoning shortcuts that may lead to sub-optimal decision-making. Behavioural economists engage in mapping the decision shortcuts that agents use in order to help increase the effectiveness of human decision-making. One treatment of this idea comes from Cass Sunstein and Richard Thaler's Nudge. Sunstein and Thaler recommend that choice architectures are modified in light of human agents' bounded rationality. A widely cited proposal from Sunstein and Thaler urges that healthier food be placed at sight level in order to increase the likelihood that a person will opt for that choice instead of a less healthy option. Some critics of Nudge have argued that modifying choice architectures will lead to people becoming worse decision-makers.

Furthermore, bounded rationality attempts to address assumption points discussed within Neoclassical Economics theory during the 1950s. This theory assumes that the complex problem, the way in which the problem is presented, all alternative choices, and a utility function, are all provided to decision-makers in advance, where this may not be realistic. This was widely used and accepted for a number of decades, however economists realised some disadvantages exist in utilising this theory. This theory did not consider how problems are initially discovered by decision-makers, which could have an impact on the overall decision. Additionally, personal values, the way in which alternatives are discovered and created, and the environment surrounding the decision-making process are also not considered when using this theory. Alternatively, bounded rationality focuses on the cognitive ability of the decision-maker and the factors which may inhibit optimal decision-making Additionally, placing a focus on organisations rather than focusing on markets as Neoclassical Economics theory does, bounded rationality is also the basis for many other economics theories (e.g. Organisational theory) as it emphasises that the "...performance and success of an organisation is governed primarily by the psychological limitations of its members..." as stated by John D.W. Morecroft (1981).

In psychology 
The collaborative works of Daniel Kahneman and Amos Tversky expand upon Herbert A. Simon's ideas in the attempt to create a map of bounded rationality. The research attempted to explore the choices made by what was assumed as rational agents compared to the choices made by individuals optimal beliefs and their satisficing behaviour. Kahneman cites that the research contributes mainly to the school of psychology due to imprecision of psychological research to fit the formal economic models, however, the theories are useful to economic theory as a way to expand simple and precise models and cover diverse psychological phenomena. Three major topics covered by the works of Daniel Kahneman and Amos Tversky include Heuristics of judgement, risky choice, and framing effect, which were a culmination of research that fit under what was defined by Herbert A. Simon as the Psychology of Bounded Rationality. In contrast to the work of Simon; Kahneman and Tversky aimed to focus on the effects bounded rationality had on simple tasks which therefore placed more emphasis on errors in cognitive mechanisms irrespective of the situation. The study undertaken by Kahneman found that emotions and the psychology of economic decisions play a larger role in the economics field than originally thought. The study focused on the emotions behind decision making such as fear and personal likes and dislikes and found these to be significant factors in economic decision making.

Bounded rationality is also shown to be useful in negotiation techniques as shown in research undertaken by Dehai et al. that negotiations done using bounded rationality techniques by labourers and companies when negotiating a higher wage for workers were able to find an equal solution for both parties.

Influence on social network structure

Recent research has shown that bounded rationality of individuals may influence the topology of the social networks that evolve among them. In particular, Kasthurirathna and Piraveenan have shown that in socio-ecological systems, the drive towards improved rationality on average might be an evolutionary reason for the emergence of scale-free properties. They did this by simulating a number of strategic games on an initially random network with distributed bounded rationality, then re-wiring the network so that the network on average converged towards Nash equilibria, despite the bounded rationality of nodes. They observed that this re-wiring process results in scale-free networks. Since scale-free networks are ubiquitous in social systems, the link between bounded rationality distributions and social structure is an important one in explaining social phenomena.

Conclusion
Bounded rationality challenges the rationality assumptions widely accepted between the 1950s and 1970s which were initially used when considering expected utility maximisation, Bayesian probability judgements, and other market-focused economic calculations. Not only does the concept focus on the ways in which humans subconsciously use satisficing in order to make decisions, but also emphasises that humans infer to a great extent, given the limited information they access prior to decision-making for complex problems. Although this concept realistically delves into decision-making and human cognition, challenging earlier theories which assumed perfect rational cognition and behaviour, bounded rationality can mean something different to everyone, and the way each person satisfices can vary dependant on their environment and the information they have access to.

See also

References

Further reading
 Bayer, R. C., Renner, E., & Sausgruber, R. (2009). Confusion and reinforcement learning in experimental public goods games. NRN working papers 2009–22, The Austrian Center for Labor Economics and the Analysis of the Welfare State, Johannes Kepler University Linz, Austria.
 
 Felin, T., Koenderink, J., & Krueger, J. (2017). "Rationality, perception and the all-seeing eye." Psychonomic Bulletin and Review, 25: 1040-1059. DOI 10.3758/s13423-016-1198-z
 Gershman, S.J., Horvitz, E.J., & Tenenbaum, J.B. (2015). Computational rationality: A converging paradigm for intelligence in brains, minds, and machines. Science, 49: 273-278. DOI: 10.1126/science.aac6076
 
 Hayek, F.A (1948) Individualism and Economic order
 
 
 Simon, Herbert (1957). "A Behavioral Model of Rational Choice", in Models of Man, Social and Rational: Mathematical Essays on Rational Human Behavior in a Social Setting. New York: Wiley.

External links

 Bounded Rationality in Stanford Encyclopedia of Philosophy
 Mapping Bounded Rationality by Daniel Kahneman
 Artificial Intelligence and Economic Theory chapter 7 of Surfing Economics by Huw Dixon.
 

Behavioral economics
Game theory
Rational choice theory
Cognitive biases